Yue opera, also known as Shaoxing opera, is the  Chinese opera genre. Only Peking opera is more popular nationwide.

Originating in Shengzhou, Shaoxing, Zhejiang Province in 1906, Yue opera features actresses in male roles as well as femininity in terms of singing, performing, and staging. Despite its rural origin, it has found a second home in Shanghai, China's most affluent city, where it managed to out-compete both Peking opera and the native Shanghai opera. As Yue opera uses is performed speaking in a variant of Wu, it is most popular in Wu-speaking areas including southern Jiangsu, Zhejiang and Shanghai. In addition, the opera also has a sizeable following in Hong Kong due to Shanghainese migration to the city. Like its performers, Yue opera fans are mainly women, resulting in a disproportionate number of love stories in its repertoire and very little acrobatic fighting.

History

Pre-history
Prior to 1906, the antecedent to Yue opera was story-singing. It was initially an entertainment for people in Sheng County. Its lyrics are mostly collected from conversations between farmers while they were working. Audiences loved these ballads because of their vivid description of daily life. The Second Opium War interfered with the local economy of Sheng County, located in the Jiangnan area, near Shanghai. Since Sheng County agriculturalists were experiencing difficulty earning their livelihoods, they started to turn this folk art into a second source of income.

Over years, the accumulation of lyrics built up the fundamental source materials for Yue opera, and the folk music gradually developed its own style. Performers also began to integrate simple acting and accompanying instruments into the folk music. It gradually became well known, both in Sheng County and neighboring counties.

Beginnings
According to oral history passed down by Yue Opera practitioners, Yue Opera began in 1906. At the end of the first month of the lunar year Zhēngyuè (simplified Chinese:正月) in 1906, artists gathered together in Chen Wanyuan (simplified Chinese: 陈万元)'s house. Although these artists usually only performed in groups of two or three and had never performed together before, Chen and other residents encouraged them to put on a joint production instead of multiple separate retelling of the stories. The first performance was thus generated. The show turned out to be a great success, and residents were delighted and willing to talk about it.

Over time more and more counties invited them to perform. Because the music's tones were similar to those of Shange (Shān Gē,山歌) people named this art Small Tunes and Songs Troupes (pinyin: Xiao Gē Wén Shū Bān, simplified Chinese:小歌文书班). The small in the name referred to its humble folk foundation and contrasted it with "large" formal opera from the area.

Performances were simple. Actors were often peasants who would perform between busy agricultural seasons. They often had no costumes and only a few props, though sometimes rented simple costumes from larger local opera troupes. Musical accompaniment was sparse consisting of only a pair of drums and a wooden clapper played by a performer offstage. This made the performances very mobile allowing the troupes to perform throughout the region. The opera used plain language in the vernacular which made it accessible and popular with local populations.

Initial development
As Small Tunes and Songs Troupes expanded in size and popularity, it entered Shanghai theaters. Due to its unique, elegant and soft singing style compared with other political and spectacular performances, Yue opera found an audience there. It soon changed its name to ShaoXing Civil Opera (pinyin: Shào Xing Wén Xì 绍兴文戏) in 1916, to better represent its performances as art pieces that reflected regional culture. However, both the singing style and banhu fiddle (accompaniment) that ShaoXing Civil Opera utilized were under-developed and vulgar compared with other, more delicate operas in Shanghai. It soon lost its prestige and popularity in this big city.

Returning to their roots in Sheng County, ShaoXing Civic Opera performers like Jinshui Wang (simplified Chinese: 王金水) put great effort into improving their performance and singing style. These artists absorbed the essence of different opera styles including Beijing Opera they had seen in Shanghai. During this process, Four Gong Pitch (pinyin: Sì Gōng Qiāng, simplified Chinese: 四工腔) became the remarkable fruit of this blending. This music pitch is extraordinary because it resolved the unnatural status women have when they play male roles. ShaoXing Civic Operatic Troupe further developed a systematic training in singing style and sound practice. It utilized erhu and other linear fiddles as alternative accompaniments to adjust music.

Women-performed opera
When Jinshui Wang came back to Sheng County, he had been deeply impressed by the prosperous artistic atmosphere in Shanghai. Having seen different forms of opera during that time and saw the business opportunities in founding an opera performed by women. In February, 1923, he opened an all girls opera class and spent huge amount of money attracting and rewarding young women to join. ("Class" here is an organization in which members work and study at the same time.)

However, the first class existed for only six years. It was transformed into the first professional women's troupe at the end of the girl's apprenticeship. In the 1920s, the social status of both women and arts performers (also known as Xizi, 戏子) was very humble. Governments assumed that operas performed by women would lower the value of the art. Under great pressure and in a limited business market, the first wave of female artists left the class after six years for marriage.

The progress these artists achieved was noteworthy. As the influence of their opera grew, more and more female classes were founded. By the beginning of the 1930s, Zhejiang Province had about two hundred female classes as well and two thousand students.

The rise of Shaoxing Literal Opera in the early 1930s
There are two well-known explanations for the rise of Shaoxing Literal Opera at that time. One of them is economic incentive. In the early 20th century, young Chinese women had only two options to earn their livelihoods. They were either sent to a wealthy family as a child bride, or to the factories to work. In 1929, the Wall Street Crash had tremendous global influence. Many factories in Shanghai closed down, and as a result, women often had no option but to attend female-performed opera classes to earn a living. These women usually received three months acting training, and then participated in performances to gain more experience in acting.

Another explanation was that the performing style of Shaoxing Literal Opera fit with women's nature . As young women tend to be more glorious on stage according to Sheng County's newspaper at that time, the tender and gentle features of Shaoxing Literal Art became more outstanding under such highlighting. Furthermore, Four Gong Qiang worked more vividly and delicately under women's performances.

Evolution
Originating in the folk song and ballad singing of rural areas in Zhejiang, by drawing on the experience of other developed Chinese opera forms such as Peking opera and Kunqu, Yueju opera became popular in Shanghai in early 1930s. During the Second Sino-Japanese War, Yueju performers in Shanghai launched a movement to reform the Yueju performance which drew influences from, new-style literature (a part of the New Culture Movement), Western drama and film, making their opera remarkably different from other forms in China. A director-centered system replaced the scene plot system that dictated how a part or scene should be acted. There was an increasing focus on the depiction of the personality and psychology of characters. New operas on new themes were developed including an adaption of Lu Xun's novel "New Year Sacrifice" 《祝福》.

After the foundation of People's Republic of China, Yueju opera was welcomed by the government and Communist Party of China at first, and reached a pinnacle popularity in late 1950s and early 1960s. During this period there was increased emphasis on dramatic realism and expressionism. However, during the Cultural Revolution, like other traditional Chinese art forms, Yueju performances were outlawed, which caused a serious setback in its development. Since the 1980s, Yueju has become popular again, while being challenged by new amusement forms.

Yueju opera features are elegant and soft, suitable for telling love stories. It was initially performed by men only, but female groups started performing in the style in 1923, and during the 1930s, the form became female-only.

Two Stage Sisters is a 1964 movie featuring Shaoxing Opera.
In the new era, Shaoxing opera was included in the national intangible cultural heritage list

Notable actors 

Yuan Xuefen
Wang Wenjuan
Fu Quanxiang
Lv Ruiying
Zhang Yunxia
Jin Caifeng
Qi Yaxian
Bi Chunfang
Fan Ruijuan
Yin Guifang
Xu Yulan
Lu Jinhua
Zhu Shuizhao
Zhao Zhigang
Mao Weitao

References

External links 
 Yueju Opera on P.R. China Ministry of Culture
Welcome to Mildchina: Yueju Opera
China's disappearing traditions: Carvings in lime, singing Yue
History of Yue Opera
Yue Opera

 
Intangible Cultural Heritage of Humanity
Culture in Zhejiang
Culture in Fujian
Shengzhou
Wu Chinese